Wunderkind (from German: Wunderkind, literally "wonder child") is a synonym for "child prodigy", a child who produces meaningful output to the level of an adult expert performer.

Wunderkind may also refer to:

 Wunderkind (band), whose members formed November Group
 Wunderkind (fashion), a German fashion brand 
 "Wunderkind" (song), by Alanis Morissette, 2005
 "The Wunderkind" (The Twilight Zone), 2019 episode of the television series The Twilight Zone

See also

 Wunder (disambiguation) 
 Wunderkind Little Amadeus, a German animated TV series